Miguel "Michel" Delesalle (22 December 1907 – 7 April 1980) was a French ice hockey player. He competed in the men's tournament at the 1936 Winter Olympics.

References

External links
 

1907 births
1980 deaths
Ice hockey players at the 1936 Winter Olympics
Olympic ice hockey players of France
Sportspeople from Buenos Aires